Xylopia elliptica is a species of plant in the Annonaceae family. It is grows naturally as a tree in Peninsular Malaysia.

References

elliptica
Endemic flora of Peninsular Malaysia
Trees of Peninsular Malaysia
Least concern plants
Least concern biota of Asia
Taxonomy articles created by Polbot